Georgos Theodotou  (born January 1, 1974, in Famagusta) is a Cypriot football defender. He last played for Anorthosis of Cyprus. His former teams are AC Omonia, AEK Larnaca and EPA Larnaca, where he started his career.

External links
 

1974 births
Living people
AEK Larnaca FC players
AC Omonia players
Anorthosis Famagusta F.C. players
Cypriot footballers
Cyprus international footballers
Association football forwards
EPA Larnaca FC players
People from Famagusta